Sciomystis is a genus of moths belonging to the family Tineidae. It contains only one species, Sciomystis amynias, which is found in India.

The wingspan is 9–10 mm. The forewings are elongate and dark fuscous. The hindwings and 
cilia are rather dark fuscous.

References

Tineidae
Monotypic moth genera
Moths of Asia
Tineidae genera
Taxa named by Edward Meyrick